The 1888–89 season was Newton Heath's first season of league football, having become a founder member of the Combination in the summer of 1888. The Combination was created as an alternative to the Football League, but its first season was never completed and the league folded in April 1889. This was unfortunate for Newton Heath, as they were considered to have the best record in the league at the time.

As well as taking part in league football for the first time, the Heathens also made their traditional entry to the Manchester and District Challenge Cup. They had reached the final in each of their four previous entries, and the 1888–89 season was to be no different. Newton Heath took on Hooley Hill in the final at Whalley Range, beating them 7–0 to win the competition for the third time.

The Combination

Manchester and District Challenge Cup

Lancashire Junior Cup

Notes

Manchester United F.C. seasons
Newton Heath LYR